Craig Steven Stimac (November 18, 1954 – January 15, 2009) was an American professional baseball catcher who played in Major League Baseball.

Stimac attended Morton West High School in Illinois and played college baseball at the University of Denver. Playing for the Denver Pioneers between 1973–1976, Stimac set several school records including total hits, home runs, total bases, runs scored, doubles and at bats.

After his major league career, he played in Italy from 1984 to 1989.

Stimac was found dead on January 15, 2009, in San Marino, due to apparent suicide.

References

External links

Craig Stimac's obituary 
Baseball Almanac
The Life and Death of Craig Stimac, from Gaslamp Ball

Major League Baseball catchers
San Diego Padres players
Reno Silver Sox players
Amarillo Gold Sox players
Hawaii Islanders players
Charleston Charlies players
Baseball players from Illinois
1954 births
2009 suicides
Denver Pioneers baseball players
Suicides by firearm in San Marino
American expatriate baseball players in Italy
American expatriate baseball players in San Marino
T & A San Marino players
Grosseto Baseball Club players